Zenodochium xylophagum is a moth in the family Blastobasidae. It is found in Spain.

The wingspan is 15–16 mm. The forewings are whitish cinereous (ash grey) densely irrorated (speckled) with mouse-grey. The hindwings are pale brassy brown.

References

Moths described in 1908
Blastobasidae